Haeundae may refer to:

Haeundae Beach, an urban beach in Busan, South Korea
Haeundae District, a district of Busan, South Korea
Haeundae station, a station on the Busan Metro Line 2
Tidal Wave (2009 film),, a 2009 South Korean disaster film